Spencer Rascoff (born October 24, 1975) is an entrepreneur and businessman. He was the co-founder and former chief executive officer of Zillow Group, and one of the co-founders of Hotwire.com. Rascoff is on the board of directors of Palantir. Rascoff was a Visiting Executive Professor at Harvard Business School where he co-created and co-taught the “Managing Tech Ventures” course.

Early life and education
Rascoff was born to Jane and Joseph Rascoff. His father was a business manager and tour producer for numerous well known musicians including The Rolling Stones, U2, and Paul Simon. Rascoff grew up in New York and then Los Angeles, where he attended Harvard-Westlake. He received a degree in 1997 from Harvard University.

Career
After graduating from college, Rascoff worked as a private equity investor at TPG Capital and as an investment banker at Goldman Sachs.

Hotwire.com

In 1999, at the age of 24, Rascoff co-founded Hotwire.com, a leading Internet travel company, which a few years later was sold to InterActiveCorp for $685 million. Rascoff then served as vice president of lodging for Expedia before leaving to co-found Zillow.

Zillow

Rascoff served various roles through the years including chief operating officer, chief financial officer, and VP of Marketing until his appointment to CEO in 2010.  As CEO, Rascoff led Zillow through its 2011 IPO and 15 acquisitions. In 2017, Rascoff was named "The Most Powerful Person in Residential Real Estate" by the Swanepoel Power 200.  Rascoff stepped down as CEO in February 2019. In April 2020, Rascoff resigned from Zillow's board of directors.

dot.la

In January 2020, Rascoff co-founded dot.la, a news site for the California tech startup industry.

Pacaso
In October 2020, Rascoff co-founded Pacaso with Austin Allison. Pacaso labels itself as a real estate platform that makes second home ownership more accessible through shared ownership. Pacaso has been described by some as an alternative take on the timeshare model of property ownership.

Other projects
In 2015, he co-wrote and published his first book, “Zillow Talk: Rewriting the Rules of Real Estate.”

References

American technology company founders
Living people
Harvard University alumni
American chief executives
Harvard-Westlake School alumni
1975 births